American filmmaker Mark Romanek directed his first music video in 1986, for The The's "Sweet Bird of Truth". He earned his first MTV Video Music Award for Best Direction nomination for "Free Your Mind", performed by En Vogue, in 1993. Romanek later directed "Closer" for the industrial rock band Nine Inch Nails, which contains imagery involving terror, sexuality, and animal cruelty. In 1995, he directed the video for "Scream", set in space and performed by Michael and Janet Jackson, as well as the New Age surrealistic "Bedtime Story", performed by Madonna. They are two of the most expensive music videos ever made, costing $7 million and $5 million, respectively. "Scream" gained 11 nominations at the 1995 MTV Video Music Awards, including Romanek's second Best Direction nomination, and his first Grammy Award for Best Music Video, Short Form.

In 1996, Romanek directed the Mary Poppins-inspired "Novocaine for the Soul" for the rock band Eels. The following year, he directed Fiona Apple's "Criminal", which explores themes of voyeurism and adolescence; and won his second Grammy Award for Best Music Video, Short Form for "Got 'til It's Gone", performed by Janet Jackson, Q-Tip and Joni Mitchell. For his work in "Hurt" (2003), performed by Johnny Cash, Romanek earned another MTV nomination, and won his third Grammy. In 2004, he directed the auto-biographical music video for Jay-Z's "99 Problems", for which he won his first MTV award. Their subsequent collaborations—the installation-style 10-minute short film for "Picasso Baby" (2013), and the animation video for "The Story of O.J." (2017)—were nominated for Grammy Award for Best Music Video.

Romanek made his feature-film directorial debut with the 1986 comedy-drama feature Static, which was nominated for Grand Jury Prize at the 1986 Sundance Film Festival. He received a Saturn Award for Best Writing nomination for his work in the psychological thriller One Hour Photo (2002), which starred Robin Williams. In 2010, he directed the romantic drama film Never Let Me Go, starring Carey Mulligan, Keira Knightley and Andrew Garfield, for which he was nominated for British Independent Film Award for Best Director. Romanek also directed several commercials for iPod, Nike, and ESPN.

Music videos

Filmography

Films

Television

Commercials

Notes

References

Sources

External links
 
 Mark Romanek videography on the official website (archived from 2008)
 Mark Romanek commercials on the official website (archived from 2005)
 Mark Romanek commercials on Advertising Age

Director videographies
American filmographies
Director filmographies